Lothar Hause (born 22 October 1955 in Lübbenau, Bezirk Cottbus) is a former football player from East Germany, who won the silver medal with the East German Olympic team at the 1980 Summer Olympics in Moscow, Soviet Union.

He played 281 matches in the East German top division for FC Vorwärts Frankfurt/Oder.

Lothar Hause won a total number of nine caps and scored one goal between 1978 and 1982 for East Germany.

References

External links
 
 

1955 births
Living people
People from Lübbenau
People from Bezirk Cottbus
German footballers
East German footballers
Footballers from Brandenburg
Association football defenders
1. FC Frankfurt players
East Germany international footballers
Olympic footballers of East Germany
Footballers at the 1980 Summer Olympics
Olympic silver medalists for East Germany
Olympic medalists in football
Medalists at the 1980 Summer Olympics
Recipients of the Patriotic Order of Merit in bronze
German footballers needing infoboxes